Schönberg may refer to:

Places

Austria 

Schönberg im Stubaital, a municipality in the district of Innsbruck-Land, Tyrol
Schönberg am Kamp, a town in the district of Krems-Land, Lower Austria

Belgium 

Schönberg (Sankt-Vith), a part of Sankt Vith, Eupen-Malmedy

Czech Republic 

Mährisch Schönberg, German name for the town Šumperk

Germany 

Schönberg (Ebringen), a mountain near Freiburg im Breisgau, Baden-Württemberg
Schönberg, Lower Bavaria, a town in the district of Freyung-Grafenau, Bavaria
Schönberg, Upper Bavaria, a town in the district of Mühldorf, Bavaria
Schönberg (Bavarian Prealps), a mountain of the Tegernsee Mountains, Bavaria
Schönberg (Bensheim), since 1939 a suburb of Bensheim, Hesse
Schönberg, a community of Kronberg im Taunus in the district of Hochtaunuskreis, Hesse
Schönberg, Mecklenburg-Vorpommern, a town in the district of Nordwestmecklenburg, Mecklenburg-Vorpommern
Schönberg, Rhineland-Palatinate, a municipality in the district of Bernkastel-Wittlich, Rhineland-Palatinate
Schönberg, Saxony, a municipality in the district of Zwickau, Saxony
Schönberg am Kapellenberg, a community of Bad Brambach, in the district of Vogtlandkreis, Saxony
Schönberg, Saxony-Anhalt, a town in the district of Stendal, Saxony-Anhalt
Schönberg, Lauenburg, a municipality in the district of Lauenburg, Schleswig-Holstein
Schönberg, Plön, a municipality in the district of Plön, Schleswig-Holstein

Latvia 

Schönberg, the German name for the village Skaistkalne

Liechtenstein 
Schönberg (Liechtenstein), a mountain in the  Rätikon

Poland 

Schönberg, the German name for Szymbark, a castle ruins and town in former East Prussia

People 
Schönberg (also spelled Schoenberg) or Schonberg is the surname of:
 Arnold Schoenberg (18741951), Austrian composer
 Claude-Michel Schönberg (born 1944), French record producer, singer, actor, songwriter and composer of musical theatre
 Dietrich III von Schönberg, brother of Cardinal Nikolaus, appointed Bishop of Dresden-Meissen in 1463
 Harold C. Schonberg (19152003), American music critic and journalist
 Mario Schönberg (19141990), Brazilian physicist
 Nikolaus von Schönberg (14721537), Archbishop of Capua and Cardinal
Johann Schönberg 18441913, Austrian artist, war-correspondent, and illustrator who moved to London and worked from there
 Johann von Schönberg, Bishop of Naumburg 1492–1517
 Hans Meinhard von Schönberg (15821616), Master of Household to Frederick V of the Palatinate

See also
 Schoenberg (surname)
 Shoenberg (disambiguation)
 Schöneberg (disambiguation)
 Schönenberg (disambiguation)
 Schönenberg-Kübelberg